Volkan Işık (born 11 September 1967) is a Turkish rally driver.

He drove in the World Rally Championship in the late 1990s and early 2000s. In a Toyota Corolla WRC, Işık and his co-driver, Erkan Bodur, were sixth and thus scored their first WRC point at the 1999 China Rally, helped by most big names dropping out of the rally including Tommi Mäkinen and Colin McRae. He became the first Turkish driver to score WRC points. Işık has also competed in the European Rally Championship and Intercontinental Rally Challenge. In 2007, he won the ELPA Rally.

References

External links
 WRC Results (eWRC)
 Volkicar

Turkish rally drivers
1967 births
World Rally Championship drivers
Intercontinental Rally Challenge drivers
Living people
European Rally Championship drivers